Jean-Louis Haillet (born 7 May 1954) is a former professional tennis player from France.  

Haillet enjoyed most of his tennis success while playing doubles.  During his career he won 2 doubles titles.

He is the son of Robert Haillet who was a professional tennis player before the Open Era.

Career finals

Doubles (2 titles, 7 runner-ups)

References

External links
 
 

French male tennis players
Sportspeople from Nice
Living people
1954 births